The following highways have been numbered 921:

Costa Rica
 National Route 921

United States